Theora is a free lossy video compression format. It is developed by the Xiph.Org Foundation and distributed without licensing fees alongside their other free and open media projects, including the Vorbis audio format and the Ogg container.

The libtheora video codec is the reference implementation of the Theora video compression format being developed by the Xiph.Org Foundation.

Theora is derived from the formerly proprietary VP3 codec, released into the public domain by On2 Technologies. It is broadly comparable in design and bitrate efficiency to MPEG-4 Part 2, early versions of Windows Media Video, and RealVideo while lacking some of the features present in some of these other codecs. It is comparable in open standards philosophy to the BBC's Dirac codec.

Theora is named after Theora Jones, Edison Carter's Controller on the Max Headroom television program.

Technical details
Theora is a variable-bitrate, DCT-based video compression scheme. Like most common video codecs, Theora also uses chroma subsampling, block-based motion compensation and an 8-by-8 DCT block. Pixels are grouped into various structures, namely blocks, super blocks, and macroblocks. Theora supports intra-coded frames and forward-predictive frames, but not bi-predictive frames which are found in H.264 and VC-1. Theora also does not support interlacing, or bit-depths larger than 8 bits per component.

Theora video streams can be stored in any suitable container format, but they are most commonly found in the Ogg container with Vorbis or FLAC audio streams. This combination provides a completely open, royalty-free multimedia format. It can also be used with the Matroska container.

The Theora video-compression format is essentially compatible with the VP3 video-compression format, consisting of a backward-compatible superset. Theora is a superset of VP3, and VP3 streams (with some minor syntactic modifications) can be converted into Theora streams without recompression (but not vice versa). VP3 video compression can be decoded using Theora implementations, but Theora video compression usually cannot be decoded using old VP3 implementations.

History

Theora's predecessor On2 TrueMotion VP3 was originally a proprietary and patent-encumbered video codec developed by On2 Technologies. VP3.1 was introduced in May 2000 and followed three months later by the VP3.2 release, which is the basis for Theora.

Move to free software
In August 2001, On2 Technologies announced that they would be releasing an open source version of their VP3.2 video compression algorithm. In September 2001, On2 Technologies published the source code of the VP3.2 codec under the VP3.2 Public License 0.1, a custom open-source license. The license only granted the right to modify the source code if the resulting larger work continued to support playback of VP3.2 data.

In March 2002, On2 responded to the public's reception by relicensing the VP3 codec under the GNU Lesser General Public License. In June 2002, On2 donated VP3 to the Xiph.Org Foundation and offered it under the Ogg Vorbis BSD-style license. On2 also made an irrevocable, royalty-free license grant for any patent claims it might have over the software and any derivatives, allowing anyone to use any VP3-derived codec for any purpose. In August 2002, On2 entered into an agreement with the Xiph.Org Foundation to make VP3 the basis of a new, free video codec, called Theora. On2 declared Theora to be VP3's successor. On 3 October 2002, On2 and Xiph announced the completion and availability of the initial alpha code release of libtheora, Theora's reference implementation.

There is no formal specification for VP3's bitstream format beyond the VP3 source code published by On2 Technologies. In 2003, Mike Melanson created an incomplete description of the VP3 bitstream format and decoding process at a higher level than source code, with some help from On2 and Xiph.Org Foundation. The Theora specification adopted some portions of this VP3 description.

A successor to Theora, Daala, was later merged into AV1.

Theora I specification

The Theora I bitstream format was frozen in June 2004 after the libtheora 1.0alpha3 release. Videos encoded with any version of the libtheora since the alpha3 will be compatible with any future player. This is also true for videos encoded with any implementation of the Theora I specification since the format freeze. The Theora I Specification was completely published in 2004. Any later changes in the specification are minor updates.

The Theora reference implementation libtheora spent several years in alpha and beta status. The first alpha version was released on 25 September 2002 and the first beta version was released on 22 September 2007. The first stable release of libtheora was made in November 2008. Work then focused on improving the codec's performance in the "Thusnelda" branch, which was released as version 1.1 in September 2009 as the second stable libtheora release. This release brought some technical improvements and new features, such as the new rate control module and the two-pass rate control.

The codename for the next version of libtheora is Ptalarbvorm.

Theora is well established as a video format in open-source applications, and became the format used for Wikipedia's video content before being mostly replaced by VP9. However, the proposed adoption of Theora as part of the baseline video support in HTML5 resulted in controversy.

Performance

Encoding performance
Evaluations of the VP3
and early Theora encoders
found that their subjective visual quality was inferior to that of contemporary video codecs. More recently however, Xiph developers compared the 1.1 Theora encoder to YouTube's H.264 and H.263+ encoders, in response to concerns raised in 2009 about Theora's inferior performance by Chris DiBona, a Google employee. They found the results from Theora to be nearly the same as YouTube's H.264 output, and much better than the H.263+ output.

The performance characteristics of the Theora 1.0 reference implementation are dominated mostly by implementation problems inherited from the original VP3 code base. Work leading up to the 1.1 stable release was focused on improving on or eliminating these. A May 2009 review of this work claimed a considerable improvement in quality, both subjectively and as measured by PSNR, just by improving the forward DCT and quantisation matrices. A flaw in the version of FFmpeg used in the test initially led to incorrect reports of Theora PSNR surpassing that of H.264. The differences in quality, bitrate and file size between a YouTube H.264 video and a transcoded Ogg video file are very small. Further work on adaptive quantization, as well as overall detailed subjective tuning of the codec, is still to come.

Playback performance
There is an open-source VHDL code base for a hardware Theora decoder in development. It began as a 2006 Google Summer of Code project, and it has been developed on both the Nios II and LEON processors. However, there are currently no Theora decoder chips in production, and portable media players, smartphones and similar devices with limited computing power rely on such chips to provide efficient playback.

Playback

Native browser playback

As originally recommended by HTML 5, these browsers support Theora when embedded by the video element:

 Mozilla Firefox 3.5 and later versions including Firefox for mobile (Fennec).
 Google Chrome as of version 3.0.182.2 including Chromium as of 14 July 2009.
Tizen browser
 SeaMonkey as of version 2.0.
 Konqueror 4.4.2
 Opera as of version 10.50. It was also supported in Opera 9.5 experimental video builds.
 Web uses WebKitGTK+ as its rendering engine. As WebKitGTK+ uses GStreamer to implement the HTML5 media player, and all the formats GStreamer supports (including Theora) are available in browser.
 Midori is another example of a browser that supports Theora by using WebKitGTK+.

Browser plugins
 Annodex plugin via OggPlay
 Cortado, a Java based applet
 Itheora, a PHP wrapper for Cortado
 Mv Embed HTML 5 video tag wrapper for numerous plugin types
 VLC media player browser plugin for IE or Firefox
 Microsoft Edge, via the Web Media Extensions add-on

Supporting media frameworks
 DirectShow with use of OpenCodecs
 GStreamer supported via Theora or FFmpeg module, supports GStreamer based applications e.g. Totem and Songbird
 Phonon
 QuickTime (including but not limited to Safari) with use of Xiph QuickTime Components
 Silverlight Highgate media suite is going to bring an Open Source Theora/Vorbis implementation in Silverlight. It will enable installation-free support for HTML5 streaming video.

Supporting applications
 FFmpeg (own implementation)
 Helix Player
 Miro Media Player (formerly known as Democracy Player)
 MPlayer and front-ends
 Songbird, Totem, Moovida and all GStreamer-based players
 VLC (native support)
 xine and all libxine-based players like Kaffeine
 Dragon player and all Phonon-based players

Encoding
There are several third-party programs that support encoding through libtheora:

The libtheora library contains the reference implementation of the Theora specification for encoding and decoding. libtheora is still under development by the Xiph.Org Foundation. The library is released under the terms of a BSD-style license.

Also, several media frameworks have support for Theora.

 The open-source ffdshow audio/video decoder is capable of encoding Theora videos using its Video for Windows (VFW) multi-codec interface within popular AVI editing programs. It supports both encoding and decoding Theora video streams and uses Theora's alpha 4 libraries. However, many of the more refined features of Theora aren't available to the user in ffdshow's interface.
 The GStreamer framework has support for parsing raw Theora streams, encoding and decoding raw Theora streams to/from YUV video

Editing

Streaming
The following streaming media servers are capable of streaming Theora video:

Makers
Elphel is the main maker of cameras that record in theora.

See also

 Video editing software
 Comparison of video codecs
 Comparison of video encoders

References

External links
 Theora.org
 Examples of Theora-encoded videos
 Why Theora Matters for Internet TV
 Theora user manual
 RTP Payload Format for Theora Encoded Video – Xiph.Org, IETF Internet Draft
 Wikipedia's controversial video player coming soon 
 H.264 and Theora codecs comparison

Articles containing video clips
Free video codecs
Open formats
Software using the BSD license
Xiph.Org projects